Mrs. Mukhyamantri is an Indian Marathi-language television family drama airing on Zee Marathi. It premiered on 24 June 2019 and concluded on 12 September 2020. It is produced by Shweta Shinde and Sanjay Khambe under the banner of Vajra Productions.

Plot 
It is a story revolves around a young small-town girl Suman from Satara, who becomes Mrs. Mukhyamantri due to the twists of fate. Suman's mother dies when she was very young. She is a hardworking girl who is trying to make a living for herself. She lives with her drunkard and steals money father Tatya. Samarsingh Mantri-Patil is a pilot by profession. Anuradha Mantri-Patil has always dreamt to become Mrs. Mukhyamantri and wants her husband Shersingh Mantri-Patil to becomes Mukhyamantri.

Cast

Main 
 Amruta Dhongade as Suman Suresh More / Suman Samarsingh Mantri-Patil (Sumi)
 Tejas Barve as Samarsingh Shersingh Mantri-Patil

Recurring 
 Samar's family
 Rajashree Sawant-Wad / Vandana Sardesai-Waknis as Anuradha Shersingh Mantri-Patil
 Raju Bawdekar as Narsu (Samar's Mama) 
 Bhakti Zanzane as Shalini (Samar's Mami) 
 Sunil Shetye as Shersingh Mantri-Patil
 Rahul Belapurkar as Laxman
 Savita Gaikwad as Geeta

 Sumi's family
 Rohit Chavan as Baban
 Gajanan Kumbhar / Shrikant Gadkar as Suresh More
 Rukmini Sutar as Bhama Aaji
 Hemangi Kavi as Ragini Shinde (Dhanashri)

Reception 
The series premiered on 24 June 2019 and aired on Zee Marathi replacing Lagira Zhala Ji.

Special episode 
 22 September 2019 (2 hours) (Samar-Sumi's Marriage)
 15 December 2019 (1 hour)

Ratings

Awards

References

External links 
 
 Mrs. Mukhyamantri at ZEE5

Marathi-language television shows
Zee Marathi original programming
2019 Indian television series debuts
2020 Indian television series endings